Robert Platt may refer to:

 Robert Platt, Baron Platt (1900–1978), British physician
 Robert Platt (canoeist) (1952–2014), French slalom canoeist
 Robert Platt (philanthropist) (1802–1882), English cotton manufacturer and philanthropist
 Robert Paus Platt (1905–1946), British diplomat
 Bob Platt (born 1932), English cricketer